Vladimir Kuznetsov (born April 21, 1984) is a Kazakhstani weightlifter.

At the 2006 World Championships he ranked 14th in the 77 kg category, with a total of 330 kg.
At the 2007 World Championships he ranked 9th in the 77 kg category, with a total of 345 kg.

He competed in Weightlifting at the 2008 Summer Olympics in the 77 kg division finishing ninth with 351 kg. This beat his previous personal best by 6 kg.

He is 5 ft 7 inches tall and weighs 172 lb.

Notes and references

External links
 Athlete Biography KUZNETSOV Vladimir at beijing2008

Kazakhstani male weightlifters
1984 births
Living people
Weightlifters at the 2008 Summer Olympics
Olympic weightlifters of Kazakhstan
Weightlifters at the 2010 Asian Games
Asian Games competitors for Kazakhstan
20th-century Kazakhstani people
21st-century Kazakhstani people